Ed Elliott (born 1985) is an English sculptor who achieved national recognition for his large wooden angel commissioned by the National Trust.
 
Elliott, who won the Hereford based  h.Art 2012 Young  Artist's Bursary,
was educated at The Chase School in Barnards Green, Malvern, Worcestershire.
and obtained a BA(Hons) in Fine Art (Sculpture) from Cardiff School of Art & Design in 2008.
His angel sculpture Greer has a 14' (4.26m) wingspan, carved from London Plane wood from the Mottisfont Estate and was commissioned by the National Trust,  The sculpture which was installed on the Trust's Mottisfont Estate near  Romsey in  Hampshire, is now part of a collection in Essex alongside sculptures by Antony Gormley, Elisabeth Frink,  and Thomas Heatherwick.

Elliott's works have also been exhibited in New Zealand, Italy, and Vietnam. He lives (as of 2012) in Malvern, and maintains a studio in Ledbury, Herefordshire, near Malvern

References

External links
Ed Elliott's web site

1985 births
Living people
English sculptors
English male sculptors
Alumni of Cardiff School of Art and Design